Infostrada TV was an Infostrada IPTV service in Italy launched in 2007 by Wind. It was shut down in June 2012.

Channel List

DTT and Radio channels

 Rai 1
 Rai 2
 Rai 3
 Rai 4
 Rete 4
 Canale 5
 Italia 1
 La7
 Rai Gulp
 MTV Italy
 Sportitalia
 Sportitalia 24
 Boing
 Rai News 24
 DeeJay TV
 Iris
 Coming Soon Television
 Rai Sport Più
 Class News
 Mediashopping
 Rai Storia
 Rai Radio 1
 Rai Radio 2
 Rai Radio 3
 Rai FD4 Leggera
 Rai FD5 Auditorium
 Rai Isoradio

Other International channels

 EuroNews (in Italian)
 BBC World
 Al Jazeera International
 TV5MONDE Europe
 TVE Internacional
 Oasi TV
 Bloomberg Television (in Italian)
 TV Moda
 SKY TG24
 Adult Movie Club
 CNN International
 Das Erste
 ZDF
 RTL
 ProSieben
 Sat.1
 Vox (German TV channel)
 3Sat

Some SKY Italia channels (included the HDTV channels) are available with a separate subscription.

For the end of 2008 is planned the start of the Video On Demand and Pay-per-view service on Infostrada TV with the first channels.

External links
 
mxl tv

Streaming television
Television channels and stations established in 2007
Television networks in Italy